The American Review of Public Administration is a peer-reviewed academic journal that covers the field of public administration. The journal's editors-in-chief are Stephanie P. Newbold and Marc Holzer. It was established in 1967 and is currently published by SAGE Publications in association with American Society for Public Administration.

Abstracting and indexing 
American Review of Public Administration is abstracted and indexed in Scopus and the Social Sciences Citation Index. According to the Journal Citation Reports, the journal has a 2021 impact factor of 4.92 ranking it 7 out of 49 journals in the category "Public Administration".

References

External links 
 

SAGE Publishing academic journals
English-language journals
Public administration journals
Publications established in 1967
Bimonthly journals